Bulgarian-Latvian relations are foreign relations between Bulgaria and Latvia. Bulgaria is represented in Latvia through its embassy in Warsaw (Poland) and through an honorary consulate in Riga. Latvia is represented in Bulgaria through its embassy in Warsaw (Poland) and through an honorary consulate in Sofia.
Both countries are full members of the European Union and NATO.

See also 
 Foreign relations of Bulgaria
 Foreign relations of Latvia
 Accession of Bulgaria to the European Union

External links 
  Latvian Ministry of Foreign Affairs about relations with Bulgaria
 Bulgarian president on two-day state visit to Latvia The America's Intelligence Wire 21-MAR-05
 Sofia, Riga Plan Coordinated Missions Abroad March 21, 2005
 Bulgaria's President Heads for Latvia March 21, 2005
 September 29, 2000 Bulgaria, Latvia pave way to lifting visa requirement 
 Bulgaria, Latvia Exchange EU Pre-accession Experience December 4, 2003
 Bulgaria, Latvia sign free trade agreement. 16-OCT-02
 Meeting-Ognian Gerdjikov–President of Latvia 05.12.2003
 Latvian Foreign Minister and Bulgarian Ambassador discuss Bulgaria's accession to the EU. 15 Nov 2006

 

 
Latvia 
Bilateral relations of Latvia